Wola Justowska is an area belonging to Zwierzyniec District Nº. VII of Kraków, Poland. It was previously a village known as Wola Chełmska until the 16th century. It became part of metropolitan Kraków in 1941.

See also
 Districts of Kraków

References